Nazi Party of Canada may refer to:

 National Unity Party (Canada), led by Adrien Arcand
 Nazi Party (Canada), led by William John Beattie